Judith Neuffer "Judy" Bruner (born Judith Ann Neuffer; June 13, 1948 - December 13, 2022) was an American naval aviator and NASA manager. She was the first woman to serve as a P-3 pilot in the United States Navy. She was part of the first group of women to receive orders for Navy Flight Training in 1973 and was first to earn her pilot's wings. She served as a senior manager at NASA's Goddard Space Flight Center, where she led numerous large programs.

Early life and education
Judith Neuffer was born on June 13, 1948, in Wooster, Ohio. Influenced in part by her father, a WWII P-38 pilot and post-war airport manager, she began accompanying her father to work during the summer at age 11. She began flight lessons at the age of 15 in a Piper Cub airplane and successfully soloed in the Cub at age 16. In 1966, Bruner enrolled at Ohio State University, where she obtained a bachelor's degree in computer science. She enlisted at the end of her junior year and was commissioned following her graduation in 1970.

Military career

The United States Navy first offered official flight training to women in 1973. Orders were cut for eight female pilots; six went on to earn their wings, Bruner included.Lieutenant William Andrew Owens was her primary flight instructor. She became the first woman to solo in a US Navy aircraft, a T-34B Mentor, on May 10, 1973. Though female flight training was at the time limited to the use of non-combat aircraft, Bruner was assigned to the P-3 aircraft — commonly used for submarine patrol and weather surveillance — at her request. During her Navy flying career, Bruner logged several thousands of hours piloting the P-3, becoming the first female P-3 Aircraft Commander and the first woman to pilot an aircraft through the eye of a hurricane.

Bruner served a total of 28 years in the United States Navy. During her 10 years on active duty, she conducted flying assignments and a tour at The US Pentagon. She then transferred to the Naval Reserve. For the remainder of her career, she held three Commanding Officer positions and also served as the Director of the Navy's Science and Technology Reserve Program. She received numerous Navy awards including four Meritorious Service Medals and the Navy Commendation Medal. Bruner retired from the United States Navy in 1998 having attained the rank of captain.

Aerospace career
Bruner began her career with NASA in 1981, working first as a contractor for UNISYS Corporation as a Senior Systems Analyst on the Hubble Space Telescope mission. Bruner formally joined NASA in 1989, working for two years as the ground system Implementation Manager on the Earth Observing System satellite missions.  Bruner was then selected to head the Spacecraft Control Center Branch. In this capacity, Bruner was assigned the responsibility for the development and implementation of all satellite control centers for missions at the Goddard Space Flight Center (GSFC) in Greenbelt, Maryland. Concurrently, Bruner also earned her M.S. Degree from the George Washington University School of Engineering and Applied Sciences in 1995.

In 1997, Bruner was assigned to Goddard Space Flight Center's Directors Staff, serving in various capacities including Acting Director of NASA's IV&V facility in West Virginia and Program Manager for the Solar and Heliospheric Observatory (SOHO) mission. When the Space Shuttle Columbia accident occurred in February 2003, Bruner served as the GSFC point of contact for the investigation and the focal point for GSFC's support of NASA's subsequent Return to Flight. Bruner was the Director of the Safety and Mission Assurance Directorate at Goddard Space Flight Center. She received the Exceptional Service Medal, the Exceptional Achievement Medal, the Outstanding Leadership Medal, and the Outstanding Management Award during her tenure at NASA.

Death 
Bruner died on December 13, 2022 in Annapolis, Maryland.

See also
United States Navy
Naval Aviation
National Aeronautics and Space Administration

References

Sources
 Pexton, Patrick. New Captains Have Flown Against Tradition. Navy Times 42:4 Apr 5 '93.

External links
 
 
 Women in the US Navy: "Ladies Wear The Blue" 1974 US Navy ("...first woman admitted to the Naval Flight Training Program.")
 Judith Bruner Women@NASA 2014 (interview, published to YouTube on Dec 2, 2014)

Female United States Navy officers
United States Navy captains
1948 births
Living people
Aviators from Ohio
Women United States Naval Aviators
21st-century American women